The 2015 NAB Challenge was the Australian Football League (AFL) pre-season competition that was played before the 2015 home and away season. It featured 27 matches across 25 days, beginning February 26 and ending March 22. It was the second year in a row where the competition did not have a Grand Final or overall winner.

Results

References

NAB Challenge
Australian Football League pre-season competition